Da Lat or Dalat, is the capital of Lâm Đồng Province and the largest city of the Central Highlands region in Vietnam. Da Lat is one of the most popular tourist destinations in Vietnam.

Da Lat's specific sights are pine woods and twisting roads full of marigold (Vietnamese: hoa dã quỳ) and mimosa blossom in the winter. The city's temperate weather stands in contrast to Vietnam's otherwise tropical climate. Mist covering the valleys almost year-round leads to its name "City of Eternal Spring".

Residents and tourists have said that Da Lat has all four seasons in one day: spring in the morning, summer at noon, autumn in the afternoon and winter at night, from the sunset to the sunrise.

Da Lat is also known as an area for scientific research in the fields of biotechnology and nuclear physics.

With its year-round cool weather, Da Lat supplies huge amounts of temperate agriculture products for all over Vietnam, for example: cabbage, cauliflower, artichoke, tea, wine, persimmon and coffee. Its flower industry produces three characteristic flowers: hydrangea (Vietnamese: cẩm tú cầu), Da Lat rose and golden everlasting (Vietnamese: hoa bất tử). The confectionery industry offers a wide range of mứt, a kind of fruit preserve that closely resembles varenie, made from strawberry, mulberry, sweet potato and rose.

Da Lat is known regionally for avocado ice-cream, for bánh tráng nướng and for its large garment market, with a broad selection of cool-weather clothing.

Name

According to some sources, the name is derived from the acronym of the Latin phrase 'Dat Aliis Laetitiam Aliis Temperiem' ("It Gives Pleasure to Some, Freshness to Others"), which the French colonial government used in their official emblem of Da Lat. In reality, however, the name  is derived from the language of the local ethnic group Lạt and its original meaning is "Stream of the Lạt", and the above acronym is in fact a backcronym.  got its name from Koho daa (“water”) + Laac (the indigenous people of Da Lat).

History

French era 

During the 1890s, explorers in the area (including the noted bacteriologist Alexandre Yersin, protégé of the renowned French chemist Louis Pasteur), which was then part of the French colony of Cochinchina, asked the French governor-general, Paul Doumer, to create a resort center in the highlands, and the governor agreed. The original intended site for the hill station was Dankia, but Étienne Tardif, a member of the road-building expedition of 1898–99, proposed the current site instead. In 1907, the first hotel was built. Urban planning was carried out by Ernest Hébrard.

Many Europeans used to travel up to Da Lat to escape the heat of the lower coastal areas. 

The French endowed the city with villas and boulevards, and its Swiss charms remain today. Hébrard included the requisite health complex, golf course, parks, schools, and homes but no industry. The legacy of boarding schools where children from the whole of Indochina were taught by French priests, nuns, and expatriates still existed as late as 1969. In 1929, the Christian and Missionary Alliance established a school which later relocated to Bangkok, Thailand, due to the Vietnam War and has been located in Penang, Malaysia, since the 1970s. There were seminaries of Jesuits (such as Pius X Pontifical College) as well as other orders.

In the 1920s and 1930s, there were ideas of making Da Lat the 'summer capital', 'administrative capital', and 'federal capital' of French Indochina. During the World War II, Governor-general Jean Decoux (r. 1940–1945) supported this project.

South Vietnamese era  

The South Vietnamese National Military Academy graduated its first class of future leaders in 1950. There was also an aviation school at Cam Ly Airport.

In the mid-1950s, the Vietnamese Scout Association established their national training grounds at Da Lat.

The only major involvement Da Lat had during the Vietnam War was during the 1968 Tet Offensive. Fierce battles raged from January 31 to February 9, 1968. Most of the fighting took place between the South Vietnamese/American MP units stationed in Da Lat and the Việt Cộng (VC) forces. Defeats and victories alternated between the two during the sporadic-yet-intense battles.

Communist Vietnam 

South Vietnam eventually came under communistic rule and was merged with the Democratic Republic of Vietnam, where the Socialist Republic of Vietnam was constructed and also experienced the Đổi Mới reforms along with the rest of the country.

During the communist era of Vietnam (the Socialist Republic of Vietnam), places like Da Lat as well as Hoi An and Da Nang were regularly regarded as amongst the most romantic tourist places in Vietnam. Da Lat has also become the hub of nuclear research and biotechnology.

Geography

Geology

Da Lat is a source area for pyroxene from meteorites from the Australasian strewnfield.

Administrative

Da Lat is divided into 11 wards numbered from 1 to 11, and 4 communes: Tà Nung, Xuân Trường, Xuân Thọ and Trạm Hành.

Climate

Da Lat features a subtropical highland climate under the Köppen climate classification (Cwb) and is mostly mild year round.

Da Lat's year-round temperate weather, standing in contrast to central & southern Vietnam's otherwise-tropical climate, has led it to be nicknamed the “City of Eternal Spring”. Mist covers the adjoining valleys almost year-round. Its temperate climate also makes it ideal for agriculture. Indeed, Da Lat is renowned for its orchids, roses, vegetables, and fruits. There are nascent wine-making and flower-growing industries in the region.

There are two separate seasons in Da Lat. The rainy season lasts from May to October, and the dry season lasts from November through April of the next year. The average annual precipitation is 1,750 mm.

Education 
Dalat University (Trường Đại học Đà Lạt)
 Yersin University (Trường Đại học Yersin Đà Lạt)
 The Pedagogical College of Da Lat (Trường Cao đẳng Sư phạm Đà Lạt)
Ho Chi Minh City University of Architecture – Đà Lạt Campus (Trường Đại học Kiến trúc TP.HCM – Phân hiệu Đà Lạt)

Architecture 

The architecture of Da Lat is dominated by the style of the French colonial period. Da Lat Railway Station, built in 1938, was designed in the Art Deco architectural style by French architects Moncet and Reveron, although it incorporates the high, pointed roofs characteristic of the Cao Nguyen communal buildings of Vietnam's Central Highlands. The three gables represent an art deco version of Normandy's Trouville-Deauville Station. The station's unique design — with its roofs, arching ceiling, and coloured glass windows — earned it recognition as a national historical monument in 2001. 
They designed the Lycée Yersin, which opened in 1927.
The Dominion of Mary Church and Convent, home to Roman Catholic nuns of the Mission of Charity, were built in 1938 with a similar pointed-roof style.

Of particular note is the unconventional architecture of the Hằng Nga guesthouse, popularly known as the “Crazy House”. Described as a “fairy tale house”, its overall design resembles a giant banyan tree, incorporating sculptured design elements representing natural forms such as animals, mushrooms, spider webs and caves. Its architecture, consisting of complex, organic, non-rectilinear shapes, has been described as expressionist. Its creator, Vietnamese architect Dang Viet Nga (also known as Hằng Nga), who holds a PhD in architecture from Moscow State University, has acknowledged the inspiration of Catalan Spanish architect Antoni Gaudí in the building's design. Visitors have variously drawn parallels between the guesthouse and the works of artists such as Salvador Dalí and Walt Disney. Since its opening in 1990, the building has gained recognition for its unique architecture, having been highlighted in numerous guidebooks and listed as one of the world's ten most “bizarre” buildings in the Chinese People's Daily.  While superficially amusing, the compound is let down by the construction debris and household refuse behind the facades, and the lack of attention to safety issues.

Da Lat is also well known for a series of three Mansions of the Vietnamese Last Emperor. The First Mansion was built in 1940 by the French millionaire Robert Clément Bourgery and was bought by Emperor Bao Dai in 1949. It was used as a summer mansion for President Ngo Dinh Diem and following presidents of the Republic of Vietnam until 1975. The Second Mansion was built in 1933 as the summer mansion for the Governor of French Indochina Jean Decoux. Built in 1933–1938, the Third Mansion was the residence of Emperor Bao Dai and his family. The mansion has attributes typical European style since both its front and backyard have flower gardens. The Third Mansion is currently open for tourists who wish to have a look back in time when Queen Nam Phuong resided during her lifetime.

Festivals
 Dalat Flower Festival (Festival hoa Đà Lạt)
 Dalat Tea Culture Week (Tuần lễ văn hóa trà Đà Lạt)
 Cherry Blossom Festival (Lễ hội hoa anh đào)
 "Đồi cỏ hồng" Festival
 Rain Festival (Lễ hội mưa)
 Gong Festival (Lễ hội cồng chiêng)

Tourism

Da Lat is one of the famous tourist cities of Vietnam which was included in the list of Asia's most overlooked places by CNN in 2017.
 Da Lat attracts both domestic tourists and foreign tourists, with more than 1,500,000 tourists and about 300,000 foreign tourists visiting the city every year. It is also the most favorite honeymoon location in Vietnam.

Hoa Binh Area is in the center downtown of Da Lat and attracts numerous visitors. Some popular sites located in the Hoa Binh Area are Coi Xay Gio bakery, Lien Hoa bakery, Windmills coffeehouse and Tung coffeehouse. Coi Xay Gio was known as a perfect selfie spot thanks to its remarkable yellow wall, though in 2021 the wall was repainted to discourage selfies due to danger from road vehicles.

Popular tourist places

 Xuan Huong Lake
 Lam Vien Square
 Hoa Binh Walking Town (Hoa Binh Area)
 The Pedagogical College of Da Lat
 Dalat Center Market
 Da Lat Railway Station
 The Palace of Bao Dai King
 Clay Tunnel of Da Lat
 Tuyen Lam Lake
 Smurf Village (Làng Xì Trum)
 Truc Lam Monastery
 Hang Nga guesthouse
 Linh Sơn Pagoda
 Dalat Flowers Garden
 Dalat Cathedral (Chicken Church)
 Domaine de Marie
 Valley of Love
 Dreamlike Hill (Mộng Mơ Hill)
 Langbiang Peak
 Prenn Waterfall
 Golden Stream Lake (Suối Vàng)
 The Maze Bar
 Vuon Yen Coffee
 Vinh Tien Tea & Wine Company
 Vu Thi Village
 Dalat Heaven Gate
 Linh Quy Phap An Pagoda
 Infinite Lake (Vô Cực Lake)
 Zoodoo Garden
 Flowers Garden and Coffee (F. Garden)
 Minions Themed Village

Gallery

See also
Da Lat–Thap Cham Railway
Dalat Palace Hotel

References

External links

Official website of the provincial government (Vietnamese)

 
Cities in Vietnam
Hills of Vietnam
Landforms of Lâm Đồng province
Districts of Lâm Đồng province
Populated places in Lâm Đồng province
Provincial capitals in Vietnam